Farid Ali (7 April 1945 – 22 August 2016) was a Bangladeshi actor.

Career
Ali debuted his acting career In 1962 when he performed in the stage drama "Kone Dekha", directed by Shahidul Amin. He first acted in television drama in "Ektala-Dotala" in 1964 and in film in "Dharapat"  in 1966.

Ali acted in notable films including Sangam, Gunda and Titash Ekti Nadir Naam.

References

External links
shakib khan

1945 births
2016 deaths
People from Dhaka
Bangladeshi male television actors
Bangladeshi male stage actors
Bangladeshi male film actors
Burials at Banani Graveyard
Bangladeshi comedians